Cator is a surname. Notable people with the surname include:

 Albemarle Cator (1877–1932), British Army officer 
 Geoffrey Edmund Cator (1884–1973), British civil servant
 John Cator (1728–1806), British timber merchant and landowner
 John Cator (Huntingdon MP) (1862–1944), English politician
 Harry Cator (1894–1966), English recipient of the Victoria Cross
 Rhonda Cator (born 1966), retired female badminton player from Australia
 Silvio Cator (1900–1952), Haitian athlete
 William Cator (1839–1902), Irish cricketer and clergyman